Diodene Efon Elad (born 5 September 1970) is an English former professional footballer who played in the Football League for Cambridge United, Mansfield Town and Northampton Town.

References

1970 births
Living people
English footballers
Association football midfielders
English Football League players
SC Fortuna Köln players
Northampton Town F.C. players
Cambridge United F.C. players
Mansfield Town F.C. players
Stevenage F.C. players
Hitchin Town F.C. players
Leighton Town F.C. players
Basingstoke Town F.C. players